Sibiti Airport  is an airport serving the city of Sibiti, Republic of the Congo. The airport is just east of the city.

The runway has an additional  of paved overrun on each end.

See also

 List of airports in the Republic of the Congo
 Transport in the Republic of the Congo

References

External links
OpenStreetMap - Sibiti

Airports in the Republic of the Congo